Ben Donaldson may refer to:
 Ben Donaldson (rugby league) (born 1979), Australian rugby league footballer
 Ben Donaldson (rugby union) (born 1999), Australian rugby union player